Theodore Otto Langerfeldt (1841-1906) was a German-American architectural renderer and painter.

Biography

Langerfeldt was born March 2, 1841, in Bückeburg, then capital of the German principality of Schaumburg-Lippe. He studied architecture at the Polytechnic School of Hanover. Circa 1863 Langerfeldt moved to England, where he studied and worked as a painter for five years. In 1868 he came to the United States, settling in Boston. He was first noted in the Boston directories in 1870 as an architect with an office in the Studio Building. From 1875 until his death he is instead noted as a watercolor artist.

Langerfeldt was best known for his architectural subjects, and was often employed by architects of Boston and New York to prepare watercolor perspective renderings for competition entries or exhibitions. These included Charles B. Atwood, George A. Clough, George Keller, McKim, Mead & White, Peabody & Stearns, William G. Preston and Frederick W. Stickney. Presenting a watercolor by Langerfeldt with a competition design was considered a great advantage. In 1876, at the Centennial Exposition in Philadelphia, one of his drawings received an award.

He was one of the first artists to provide professional rendering services to architects, preceding a later generation which included E. Eldon Deane, David A. Gregg and Hughson Hawley, among others. He largely withdrew from work for architects in the 1890s, as his health worsened. Following an illness of ten years, Langerfeldt died September 7, 1906, in Boston.

Langerfeldt signed his drawings "T. O. L." In addition to his architectural work, Langerfeldt also painted landscapes, and had a solo show at the Boston Art Club in 1874. Two of his landscapes are in the collection of the Museum of Fine Arts, Boston.

References

1841 births
1906 deaths
19th-century American painters
19th-century American male artists
American male painters
20th-century American painters
German emigrants to the United States
Artists from Boston
People from Bückeburg
20th-century American male artists